Leikanger is a village in Stad Municipality in Vestland county, Norway. Leikanger Church is located in the village. There is some industry in the village as well as some small farming and fishing.

Just south of the village at Dragseidet is a large stone cross that was erected in 1913 to commemorate the meeting in 997 led by Olav Tryggvason to persuade the leaders of Norway to convert to Christianity.

References

Stad, Norway
Villages in Vestland